
Gmina Kęsowo is a rural gmina (administrative district) in Tuchola County, Kuyavian-Pomeranian Voivodeship, in north-central Poland.

Villages
Gmina Kęsowo contains the villages and settlements of Adamkowo, Bralewnica, Brzuchowo, Drożdzienica, Grochowo, Jeleńcz, Kęsowo, Krajenki, Ludwichowo, Nowe Żalno, Obrowo, Pamiętowo, Piastoszyn, Przymuszewo, Sicinki, Siciny, Tuchółka, Wieszczyce and Żalno.

Neighbouring gminas
Gmina Kęsowo is bordered by the gminas of Chojnice, Gostycyn, Kamień Krajeński, Sępólno Krajeńskie and Tuchola.

References
 Polish official population figures 2006

Kesowo
Tuchola County